In Greek mythology, Asia (Ancient Greek: Ἀσία) was one of the 3,000 Oceanids, daughters of the Titans Oceanus and his sister-spouse Tethys. In some accounts, her mother was called Pompholyge and sister of Libye.

Family 
According to Apollodorus, Asia was the wife of the Titan Iapetus, and mother of Atlas, Prometheus, Epimetheus and Menoetius although Hesiod gave the name of another Oceanid, Clymene, as their mother.

It is possible that the name Asia became preferred over Hesiod's Clymene to avoid confusion with the Clymene who was mother of Phaethon by Helios in some accounts and must have been perceived as a distinct figure. Herodotus recorded the tradition that the continent Asia was named after Asia whom he called wife of Prometheus rather than mother of Prometheus, perhaps here a simple error rather than genuine variant tradition. Both Acusilaus and Aeschylus in his Prometheus Bound called Prometheus' wife Hesione.

Herodotus also related a Lydian tradition "that Asia was not named after Prometheus' wife Asia, but after Asies, the son of Cotys, who was the son of Manes, and that from him the Asiad clan at Sardis also takes its name".

Genealogy

See also  
Asia's name etymology
67 Asia

Notes

References
 Apollodorus, Gods & Heroes of the Greeks: The Library of Apollodorus, Michael Simpson (translator), The University of Massachusetts Press, (1976). .
Apollodorus, The Library with an English Translation by Sir James George Frazer, F.B.A., F.R.S. in 2 Volumes, Cambridge, MA, Harvard University Press; London, William Heinemann Ltd. 1921. ISBN 0-674-99135-4. Online version at the Perseus Digital Library. Greek text available from the same website.
 Bell, Robert E., Women of Classical Mythology: A Biographical Dictionary. ABC-Clio. 1991. .
Herodotus; Histories, A. D. Godley (translator), Cambridge: Harvard University Press, 1920; . Online version at the Perseus Digital Library.
 Hesiod, Theogony, in The Homeric Hymns and Homerica with an English Translation by Hugh G. Evelyn-White, Cambridge, MA., Harvard University Press; London, William Heinemann Ltd. 1914. Online version at the Perseus Digital Library.

External links 
 CLYMENE-ASIA from The Theoi Project

Oceanids
Greek goddesses
Asia in Greek mythology
Lydia
Sea and river goddesses